Samastipur  Vidhan Sabha (assembly) constituency is in Samastipur district in the Indian state of Bihar.

Overview
As per Delimitation of Parliamentary and Assembly constituencies Order, 2008, No. 133 Warisnagar Assembly constituency is composed of the following: Samastipur municipality, Samastipur community development block; and Shahpur Baghauni, Bherokhara, Tajpur, Adharpur and Baghi gram panchayats of Tajpur CD Block. In 2015 Bihar Legislative Assembly election, Samastipur will be one of the 36 seats to have VVPAT enabled electronic voting machines.

Samastipur Assembly constituency is part of No. 23 Samastipur (Lok Sabha constituency).

Members of Vidhan Sabha
 1957, Samastipur East : Sahdeo Mahto (INC)  
 1957, Samastipur West : Jadunandan Sahay (INC) 
 1962, Samastipur East : Sahdeo Mahto (INC)  
 1962, Samastipur West : Tej Narain Ishwar (INC)
 1967 : R.N. Sharma (SSP) : 20,976	S. Mahto	M	INC	17038
 1980 : Karpoori Thakur (Janata Party - Secular) 
 1985 : 
 1990 : 
 2000 : Ashok Singh of RJD
 Feb 2005 : Shahid Ahmed of RJD
 Oct 2005 : Ramnath Thakur  of JD(U)
 2010 : Akhtarul Islam Sahin (Rashtriya Janata Dal) 
 2015 : Akhtarul Islam Sahin (RJD)
 2020 : Akhtarul Islam Sahin (RJD)

Election results

2020

2015

1967 Vidhan Sabha Election
 R.N. Sharma (SSP) : 20,976 votes  
 S. Mahto (INC) : 17,038

1977-2010
In the 2010 state assembly elections, Akhtarul Islam Sahin of RJD won the Samstipur seat defeating his nearest rival Ramnath Thakur of Janata Dal (United)|JD(U). Contests in most years were multi cornered but only winners and runners up are being mentioned. Ramnath Thakur  of JD(U) defeated  Nizam Ahmed of RJD in October 2005, Shahid Ahmed of RJD in February 2005 and Ashok Singh of RJD in 2000. Ashok Singh of Janata Dal defeated Shahid Hushan Khan of BPP in 1995 and Visheshwar Rai of Indian National Congress in 1990. Ashok Singh of Lok Dal defeated Jai Narain Rai of Congress in 1985. Karpoori Thakur of Janata Party (SC) defeated Chandra Shekhar Verma of Congress(I) in 1980. Chandra Sekhar Singh of Janata Party defeated Ram Chandra Rai of Congress in 1977.

References

External links
 

Assembly constituencies of Bihar
Politics of Samastipur district
Samastipur